Manterola is a surname. Notable people with the surname include:

Ainara Manterola (born 1995), Spanish footballer
Javier Manterola (born 1936), Spanish civil engineer
José Manterola (1849–1884), Basque writer
Patricia Manterola (born 1972), Mexican singer, actress, model and fashion designer